The Men's Heavyweight Weightlifting Event (105 kg) is the seventh men's weight class event at the weightlifting competition, limiting competitors to a maximum of 105 kilograms of body mass. The competition at the 1999 World Weightlifting Championships took place on in Athens, Greece, on 28 November 1999.

Each lifter performed in both the snatch and clean and jerk lifts, with the final score being the sum of the lifter's best result in each. The athlete received three attempts in each of the two lifts; the score for the lift was the heaviest weight successfully lifted.

Denys Hotfrid of Ukraine won the gold medal. Evgeny Shishlyannikov of Russia finished second and Korean weightlifter Choi Jong-keun finished third and won the bronze.

Medalists

Records

Results

References

Weightlifting Databank
Weightlifting World Championships Seniors Statistics, Pages 29–30 

- Mens 105 kg, 1999 World Weightlifting Championships